The Wyoming Game and Fish Department is the State of Wyoming's state agency charged with stewardship of the state's fish, game, and wildlife resources. The department sets fish and game regulations, including issuance of hunting and fishing licenses and enforcement of state regulations throughout the state. The department also enforces watercraft regulations and registration, along with enforcement of invasive species laws. The agency is headquartered in Cheyenne.

See also

 Game warden
List of law enforcement agencies in Wyoming
Wyoming Division of State Parks and Historic Sites
List of State Fish and Wildlife Management Agencies in the U.S.

References

External links
 

State law enforcement agencies of Wyoming
Environment of Wyoming
State agencies of Wyoming
Natural resources agencies in the United States
1973 establishments in Wyoming